Rufus Saxton (October 19, 1824 – February 23, 1908) was a Union Army brigadier general during the American Civil War who received America's highest military decoration, the Medal of Honor, for his actions defending Harpers Ferry during Confederate General Jackson's Valley Campaign. After the war he served as the Freedmen's Bureau's first assistant commissioner.

Early life
Saxton was born in Greenfield, Massachusetts, to Jonathan and Miranda Saxton. His father was a Unitarian and a Transcendentalist whose feminist and abolitionist writings were heard on the lyceum circuit. He descended from a family of Unitarian ministers (Ashley, Williams, Edwards). His father attempted to secure a place for Rufus Saxton at Brook Farm in West Roxbury, Massachusetts, a transcendentalist community started by George Ripley and attended by Nathaniel Hawthorne. Rufus Saxton's brother Samuel Willard "Will" Saxton attended Brook Farm in his stead, learning the printing trade for the Farm's publication The Harbinger.

Rufus Saxton was educated at the United States Military Academy at West Point, graduating in 1849. His antebellum career included posts fighting Seminoles in Florida, teaching artillery tactics at West Point, surveying the uncharted Rocky Mountains on George B. McClellan's staff in advance of the Northern Pacific Railroad (1853), and map work for the Coastal Survey. He was promoted to first lieutenant in March 1855.

Rufus Saxton married a Philadelphian missionary, Mathilda Thompson, who had come South to teach the newly freed blacks with her newspaper journalist brother.

His brother Will joined Rufus Saxton in South Carolina as his aide-de-camp and printer during the Port Royal Experiment.

Civil War
As the Civil War broke out, Saxton served as a quartermaster and ultimately a brigadier general for the Union forces. During the war, he commanded the Union defenses at Harpers Ferry and he was awarded the Medal of Honor for his "gallant service" there in May and June 1862. According to a New York Times article of April 22, 1893, about Saxton's award, "So far to only two other general officers have been awarded the medals, Gens. Schofield and Miles." Later in 1862, he was appointed  quartermaster of the South Carolina Expeditionary Corps based at Hilton Head during much of Union occupation of the Island and was in charge of supplying contraband colonies in the region including on Edisto Island and at Port Royal Saxton was later appointed military governor of the Department of the South. As such, he directed the recruitment of the first regiments of black soldiers who fought in the Union army.

Postbellum career
Saxton later served as assistant commissioner for the Freedmen's Bureau, where he pursued the policy of settling freed slaves in land confiscated from white landowners in the Sea Islands, until he was removed from his position by President Andrew Johnson.

After the Civil War, Saxton remained in the Army, serving in the Quartermaster Corps.

He retired in 1888 as a colonel and assistant quartermaster general and lived in Washington, D.C. until his death.  He was a member of the Military Order of the Loyal Legion of the United States and the Sons of the American Revolution.

He is honored with a private memorial in Arlington National Cemetery.

African-American relations
Saxton was an abolitionist and proponent for greater civil rights for blacks. According to an account by his close personal friend, author Thomas Wentworth Higginson, Saxton "had been almost the only cadet in his time at West Point who was strong in anti-slavery feeling, and who thus began with antagonisms which lasted into actual service."

In 1866, Saxton testified before Congress's Joint Committee on Reconstruction, saying "I think if the Negro is put in possession of all his rights as a citizen and as a man, he will be peaceful, orderly, and self-sustaining as any other man or class of men, and that he will rapidly advance." Saxton also spoke in Congress against widespread confiscation of firearms owned by African-Americans, stating such actions were "clear and direct violation of their personal rights" as described in the Second Amendment.

Saxton appointed his friend, author and abolitionist Thomas Wentworth Higginson, colonel of the 1st South Carolina Volunteers, the first official black regiment. Rufus Saxton figures prominently in Higginson's book Army Life in a Black Regiment (1870). On the anniversary of the Emancipation Proclamation, Higginson and Saxton were both presented with engraved silver ceremonial swords by the freedmen.

Namesake
The Saxton School established to educate African Americans in Charleston was named for him. Battery Barlow-Saxton at Fort MacArthur is named in his honor.

Medal of Honor citation

Rank and Organization:
Brigadier General, U.S. Volunteers. Place and date: The Shenandoah Valley Campaign at Harpers Ferry, Virginia, 26 to May 30, 1862. Entered service at: Deerfield, Massachusetts Birth: Greenfield, Massachusetts Date of issue: April 25, 1893.

Citation:
Distinguished gallantry and good conduct in the defense.

See also

List of Medal of Honor recipients
List of American Civil War Medal of Honor recipients: Q–S
List of American Civil War generals (Union)
List of Massachusetts generals in the American Civil War

Notes

External links 

 Rufus and S. Willard Saxton papers (MS 431). Manuscripts and Archives, Yale University Library. 

1824 births
1908 deaths
American Civil War recipients of the Medal of Honor
American explorers
American Unitarians
Burials at Arlington National Cemetery
Deerfield Academy alumni
People from Greenfield, Massachusetts
People of Massachusetts in the American Civil War
Sons of the American Revolution
Union Army generals
United States Army Medal of Honor recipients
United States Military Academy alumni
United States military governors
American abolitionists